Following is a list of senators of Rhône, people who have represented the department of Rhône in the Senate of France.

Third Republic

Senators for Rhône under the French Third Republic were:

 Marie-Edmond Valentin (1876–1879)
 Jules Favre (1876–1880)
 Jean-Baptiste Perret (1876–1882)
 Lucien Mangini (1876–1882)
 Germain Vallier (1880–1883)
 Édouard Millaud (1880–1912)
 Louis Munier (1882–1896)
 Émile Guyot (1882–1906)
 Jean-Claude Perras (1885–1899)
 François Thévenet (1892–1900)
 Albert Bouffier (1897–1909)
 Louis Million (1899–1900)
 Léon Repiquet (1900–1909)
 Antonin Gourju (1900–1909) and (1920–1926)
 Henry Fleury-Ravarin (1906–1909)
 Antoine Ponteille (1909–1918)
 Victor Vermorel (1909–1920)
 Georges Eugène Charles Beauvisage (1909–1920)
 Paul Cazeneuve (1909–1920)
 Édouard Herriot (1912–1919)
 Eugène Ruffier (1920–1924)
 Jean Coignet (1920–1927)
 Paul Duquaire (1920–1927)
 Eugène Bussy (1920–1927)
 Laurent Bonnevay (1924–1927)
 Justin Godart (1926–1940)
 Robert Lacroix (1927–1931)
 Jean Voillot (1927–1936)
 Irénée Giraud (1927–1936)
 Camille Rolland (1927–1940)
 Émile Bender (1931–1940)
 Joseph Depierre (1936–1940)
 Jean Froget (1936–1940)

Fourth Republic

Senators for Rhône under the French Fourth Republic were:

 Maria Pacaut (1946–1948)
 Germain Pontille (1946–1948)
 Louis Dupic (1946–1959)
 Joseph Voyant (1946–1959)
 Auguste Pinton (1946–1959)
 André Lassagne (1948–1953)
 Claudius Delorme (1948–1959)
 Florian Bruyas (1953–1959)

Fifth Republic 
Senators for Rhône under the French Fifth Republic:

 Florian Bruyas (1959–1968)
 Auguste Pinton (1959–1977)
 Joseph Voyant (1959–1977)
 Claudius Delorme (1959–1977)
 Camille Vallin (1959–1968) and (1977–1986)
 Francisque Collomb (1968–1995)
 Léon Chambaretaud (1968–1974)
 Pierre Vallon (1974–1995)
 Franck Sérusclat (1977–1999)
 Alfred Gerin (1977–1986)
 Serge Mathieu (1977–2004)
 Jean Mercier (1977–1986)
 René Trégouët (1986–2004)
 Emmanuel Hamel (1986–2003)
 Roland Bernard (1986–1995)
 Guy Fischer (1995–2014)
 Gilbert Chabroux (1995–2004)
 Jacques Moulinier (2003–2004)
 Muguette Dini (2004–2014)
 Christiane Demontès (2004–2014)
 Jean-Jacques Pignard (2009–2012) then in 2014
 Michel Mercier, Union pour la démocratie française (1995-2009), Named minister 23 June 2009, replaced by Jean-Jacques Pignard from 24 July 2009 to 16 May 2012, resigned 22 April 2014, replaced by Jean-Jacques Pignard

Senators from 2014

Senators from 2014 were:

References

Sources

 
Lists of members of the Senate (France) by department